Background is a 1973 American self-portrait short documentary film directed by Carmen D'Avino. It was nominated for an Academy Award  for Best Documentary Short. The film was preserved by the Academy Film Archive in 2012.

See also
 List of American films of 1973

References

External links

1973 films
1973 documentary films
1973 short films
1970s English-language films
1970s short documentary films
American short documentary films
1970s American films